Romi Mayes is a Canadian blues guitarist and a singer songwriter starting in the 1990s.

She is a Juno nominated, CFMA nominated, 6 time Western Canadian Music Awards winner. Mayes performs and is a producer for the Canadian company Curbside Concerts, which was founded due to Covid-19 to safely bring live music to communities.

Styles
Raised on classic rock, blues, country and bluegrass, and Motown, Romi Mayes' songwriting and guitar style is a conglomerate of all these styles.

Awards and reviews
Juno nominated and 6 time Western Canadian Music Award winner for Songwriter of The Year, Album of The Year, Blues Artist of The Year.

Discography
Solo albums
1997 - Off The Wagon
2002 - On The Road in 2 Days
2004 - Mayes and Carmichael
2005 - The Living Room Sessions Volume 1 (Romi Mayes and the Temporarily Unemployed)
2006 - Sweet Somethin' Steady
2007 - Beverley Street - The Songs of David Essig (Romi Mayes and The D.Rangers)
2009 - Achin' In Your Bones
2011 - Lucky Tonight
2015 - Devil On Both Shoulders

Compilation albums
2004 - Guess Who's Home (Hand Me Down World)
2006 - High Roads
2006 - High Water Everywhere
2006 - The Life and Times of Christian Banks
2006 - Don't You Think We Should Be Closer
2006 - Comin' Home Soon
2007 - Let'R Buck
2009 - Where Great Oaks Grow

References

Canadian country singer-songwriters
Canadian women singers
Musicians from Winnipeg
Living people
1975 births